The Toyama Grouses are a Japanese basketball team, playing in the Central Conference of the B.League.  They are based in Toyama Prefecture.

Head coaches
Masato Fukushima
Takatoshi Ishibashi
Charles Johnson (2009–10)
Kohei Eto
Kazuaki Shimoji
Bob Nash (2012–17)
Miodrag Rajković (2017–18)
Don Beck
Honoo Hamaguchi

Roster

Notable players

Arenas
Toyama City Gymnasium
Toyama Prefectural General Sports Center
Toyama Seibu Sports Center

References
Toyama Grouses at Asia-basket.com

External links

 
Basketball teams in Japan
Sports teams in Toyama Prefecture
Basketball teams established in 2005
2005 establishments in Japan